The Una River is a river of Bahia state in eastern Brazil. It discharges into the Atlantic Ocean after flowing past the town of Valença.
The mouth of the river, in the form of a delta, contains 26 islands, the largest of which is Tinharé, where the Morro de São Paulo is located.

See also
List of rivers of Bahia

References

Rivers of Bahia